Lalkar is a London-based bi-monthly political magazine. The word ‘lalkar’ means ‘challenge’ in Punjabi and the expression ‘lal kar’ means ‘red work’.

History and profile
Lalkar was founded in 1967. Formerly the official journal of the Indian Workers' Association, it is now an independent Marxist-Leninist journal edited by Harpal Brar, chairman of the Communist Party of Great Britain (Marxist-Leninist).

See also
Proletarian (magazine)

References

External links
 
 WorldCat record

Bi-monthly magazines published in the United Kingdom
Political magazines published in the United Kingdom
Communist magazines
Magazines published in London
Magazines established in 1967
Marxist magazines